These are the election results of the 2021 Malacca state election. The elections was held in Malacca on 20 November 2021. Voting officially closed after 5.30pm that day. Elected members of the legislative assembly (MLAs) will be representing their constituency from the first sitting of respective state legislative assembly to its dissolution.

The state legislature election deposit was set at RM5,000 per candidate. Similar to previous elections, the election deposit will be forfeited if the particular candidate had failed to secure at least 12.5% or one-eighth of the votes.

Map

Full result

https://lom.agc.gov.my/ilims/upload/portal/akta/outputp/1715764/PUB%20583.pdf

References 

2021
2021 elections in Malaysia
2021 in Malaysia
Election results in Malaysia